The Maurice Podoloff Trophy is an annual National Basketball Association (NBA) award given since the 2022–23 season to the team with the best overall record at the end of the regular season. The award is named after Maurice Podoloff, who served as the first commissioner (then president) of the NBA from 1946 until 1963.

Prior to 2021, the Podoloff Trophy was given to the most valuable player of the NBA regular season. However, this was changed in 2022 when the NBA renamed the MVP trophy after Michael Jordan, and a new Podoloff Trophy was unveiled to reward a team's regular season performance.

See also 

 Presidents' Trophy (the National Hockey League equivalent)
 Supporters' Shield (the Major League Soccer equivalent)

Notes

References 

National Basketball Association awards
National Basketball Association lists
Awards established in 2022
2022 establishments in the United States